Local government in the Australian state of Victoria consists of 79 local government areas (LGAs). Also referred to as municipalities, Victorian LGAs are classified as cities (34), shires (38), rural cities (6) and boroughs (1). In general, an urban or suburban LGA is called a city and is governed by a City Council, while a rural LGA covering a larger rural area is usually called a shire and is governed by a Shire Council. Local councils have the same administrative functions and similar political structures, regardless of their classification.

They will typically have an elected council and usually a mayor or shire president responsible for chairing meetings of the council. The City of Melbourne has a Lord Mayor and Deputy Lord Mayor, who are directly elected, and in the other councils a mayor and deputy mayor are elected by fellow Councillors from among their own number. Since 2017, the mayor of the City of Greater Geelong has not been directly elected. There are 10 unincorporated areas, consisting of small islands or ski resorts, which are administered either by the state government or management boards.

Council elections are held every four years on the fourth Saturday in October. The last council elections were held on 22 October 2016. An election was not held for the City of Greater Geelong, which was under administration until council elections were held on 27 October 2017. In 2016, 637 local Councillors were elected in the 78 Councils contested. Casual vacancies of councilors are filled by countback of the last ballots, except for the Lord Mayor of Melbourne, which is filled by a by-election.

History 
Local government has existed in Victoria since before its separation from New South Wales in 1851. The Town of Melbourne was established by an Act of the NSW Governor and Legislative Council in 1842 and the Borough of Geelong was established in 1849. Both bodies continued after the creation of Victoria as a separate colony, and both later became cities. Road districts were established under legislation passed in 1853. From 1862 many road districts became shires pursuant to the District Councils Bill 1862. There were 96 road districts or shires created by 1865. 

The first Victorian general Act dealing with local government was the Local Government Act of 1874. The act empowered shires to be established in territories that could financially support them, and boroughs to be established in areas not exceeding  with a population of at least 300. Promotion to town or city status was dependent upon the gross revenue of the council. Promotion was not automatic, but it was granted often.

Local government has been referred to in the Victorian constitution since 1979 (sec. IIA). It does not operate as to make Victoria a federation or protect the borders or powers of local government from amendment by executive order or act of parliament. Today, the constitution recognises it "a distinct and essential tier of government" and prohibits a council being dismissed by executive order, but grants significant powers to the state parliament in respect of local government. The clauses have been amended many times by parliament, but since 2006 the Constitution Act has required a referendum to further alter them.

The current Local Government Act dates to 1989 and eliminated administrative distinctions between cities and shires, introduced the category of rural city and removed the possibility of declaring any further boroughs or towns (existing boroughs and towns were retained, although only one, the Borough of Queenscliffe, remains today, the others being abolished with the 1994 restructure). Five shires became rural cities but were dissolved with the 1994 restructure.

In 1992, there were 65 cities in Victoria. In 1994, the Jeff Kennett government restructured local government in Victoria. His reforms dissolved 210 councils and sacked 1600 elected councillors, and created 78 new councils through amalgamations. In suburban Melbourne 53 municipalities were reduced to 26. The new local government areas (LGAs) were headed by commissioners appointed by the State Government. Democratically elected councils returned in 1996. 

The 79th LGA was created in 2002 when the Shire of Delatite was split into the Rural City of Benalla and the Shire of Mansfield. A new City of Sunbury was proposed to be created from part of the City of Hume after the 2016 council elections, but this was abandoned by the Victorian Government in October 2015.

General characteristics 

All local government areas (i.e. cities, rural cities, shires and boroughs) are governed in a similar fashion, with an elected council, one of whom is the mayor (in shires the mayor may use the title "president"; the City of Melbourne has the title "lord mayor"). The City of Melbourne has a directly elected Lord Mayor and Deputy Lord Mayor, whereas other councils elect a mayor from one of their number. The City of Greater Geelong has not had a directly elected mayor since 2017. 

Some LGAs are divided into wards for the purpose of electing Councillors. Where a ward elects a single councillor, it is by preferential voting. Where it elects multiple councillors, it is by proportional voting using the Single Transferable Vote. Voting is in all cases compulsory for enrolled voters. Elections for all councils now happen on the same day every four years—on the fourth Saturday in October two years after state parliamentary elections.

Despite this area being comparable to the average area of a US or English county, there are no administrative subdivisions such as American towns and cities or English parishes; suburbs (a part of an urban area), towns and rural districts, although legally defined, have a purely geographical existence.

According to the Local Government Act 1989, the term "city" must be used for a municipal district which is predominantly urban in character. "Rural city" must be used for a rural district which is partly urban and partly rural in character. The term "shire" must be used for a municipal district which is predominantly rural. In practice, this is understood as referring to the population distribution between urban centres and rural areas. 

The term "borough", used in the Borough of Queenscliffe, is not defined by the Act but has been retained for the single borough which survived the reforms of the 1990s. Under the repealed Local Government Act 1958, boroughs, towns and cities were defined on the basis of area, population and rateable property. In practice, boroughs were and are small towns.

Political composition 

In contrast to ones at federal and state levels, local government elections in Victoria are a generally non-partisan affair. Major political parties typically do not endorse candidates at the council level. This has resulted in a situation where councillors may hold political party affiliation, but instead contest the election as an independent. These nominal independents have attracted controversy, with their affiliation being branded as insufficiently transparent. As the VEC, unlike in jurisdictions such as New South Wales, provides no way for party affiliation to be listed for council elections, candidates appear without any party label on ballot papers.

As a result, the overwhelming majority of councillors in Victoria are independents. The prevalence of independent councillors is generally larger in regional and rural areas, with metropolitan LGAs having a greater number of party-affiliated councillors. Nonetheless, recent trends have seen greater party involvement within local government politics. This participation has been large among smaller parties such as the Greens, with the major political parties subsequently indicating a potential change to their approach to council elections. Various residents' associations, community alliances and independent groups also sporadically contest elections.

The current political composition of Victorian LGAs is as follows:

Municipalities of Greater Melbourne 

Thirty-one of the municipalities form the Greater Melbourne area, each being wholly, or partly, within the Melbourne metropolitan or urban area. All Melbourne suburbs lie within these municipalities. The outer of these municipalities such as Cardinia Shire and Yarra Ranges Shire have much of their area outside Melbourne's urban area. Greater Melbourne and regional municipalities are sometimes treated differently by state government legislation, for instance the Public Holidays Act permits non-metropolitan councils to replace Melbourne Cup Day with a local public holiday.

Unincorporated areas 
In addition to the LGAs, there are also 10 small unincorporated areas within the state. These comprise both coastal islands and alpine resorts. The coastal islands are:
French Island and Sandstone Island incorporating Elizabeth Island
Gabo Island
Lady Julia Percy Island

These coastal island unincorporated areas are directly administered by the state of Victoria.

Six alpine resorts are excised from the surrounding shires by declarations made under the Alpine Resorts Act 1983 and administered by Alpine Resort Victoria under the Alpine Resorts (Management) Act 1997. The alpine resorts are considered to be municipal districts for the purposes of the Emergency Management Act 1986 and the Environment Protection Act 1970,. The alpine resorts are:
Falls Creek Alpine Resort (surrounded by the Alpine Shire)
Lake Mountain Alpine Resort
Mount Baw Baw Alpine Resort
Mount Buller Alpine Resort (surrounded by Shire of Mansfield)
Mount Hotham Alpine Resort
Mount Stirling Alpine Resort

They are rarely included in lists of local government areas and are not considered to be LGAs by the Australian Bureau of Statistics, with their population included in the unincorporated areas section of such lists, but are occasionally listed alongside municipalities.

See also 

Local government in Australia
Local government areas of Victoria
List of localities (Victoria)
Counties of Victoria
Road districts of Victoria (Australia)

References

External links 

Victoria (Australia)

Local government areas